General elections were held in Tuvalu on 12 September 1985. As there were no political parties, all candidates for the 12 seats ran as independents, with nine of the incumbents retaining their seats. Tomasi Puapua was re-elected Prime Minister following the elections.

Results
Nine incumbent members were re-elected, including Prime Minister Tomasi Puapua and Minister of Finance Henry Naisali. On 21 September, Tomasi Puapua was re-elected as Prime Minister; he subsequently appointed a five-member Cabinet.

References

Tuvalu
Elections in Tuvalu
Election
Non-partisan elections
Election and referendum articles with incomplete results